North Madison is a census-designated place (CDP) comprising the unincorporated communities of Redbird and Madison-on-the-Lake in Lake County, Ohio, United States. The population was 8,547 at the 2010 census. The area uses a mailing address of "Madison", with the ZIP Code 44057.

Geography
The North Madison CDP is located in northeastern Lake County at  (41.832044, -81.057826), along the shore of Lake Erie in the northern part of Madison Township. The area known as Redbird is in the western part of the CDP, and Madison-on-the-Lake is in the eastern part.

Demographics

As of the 2010 census of 2010, there were 8,547 people, 3,323 households, and 2,306 families residing in the CDP. The population density was 2,120.2 people per square mile (813.7/km2). There were 3,323 housing units at an average density of 852.5/sq mi (329.1/km2). The racial makeup of the CDP was 98.4% White, 0.9% African American, 0.8% Native American, 0.38% Asian, 0.6% from other races, and 0.6% from two or more races. Hispanic or Latino of any race were 1.8% of the population.

There were 3,077 households, out of which 32.5% had children under the age of 18 living with them, 50.7% were married couples living together, 12.5% had a female householder with no husband present, and 30.6% were non-families. 24.8% of all households were made up of individuals, and 8.6% had someone living alone who was 65 years of age or older. The average household size was 2.57 and the average family size was 3.05.

In the CDP, the population was spread out, with 25.8% under the age of 18, 8.6% from 18 to 24, 27.0% from 25 to 44, 27.6% from 45 to 64, and 12.0% who were 65 years of age or older. The median age was 38.5 years. For every 100 females, there were 97.1 males. For every 100 females age 18 and over, there were 94.5 males.

The median income for a household in the CDP was $44,535, and the median income for a family was $48,709. Males had a median income of $40,207 versus $23,689 for females. The per capita income for the CDP was $18,473. About 4.8% of families and 5.9% of the population were below the poverty line, including 7.4% of those under age 18 and 4.8% of those age 65 or over.

References

Census-designated places in Lake County, Ohio
Census-designated places in Ohio
Ohio populated places on Lake Erie